Veaceslav Rusnac (born 27 August 1975) is a Moldovan former footballer and current manager.

Honours
Sheriff Tiraspol	
Moldovan National Division: 2013–14
Moldovan Cup:
 Runner-Up : 2013-14

References

External links

1975 births
Living people
Moldovan footballers
Moldovan expatriate footballers
FC Zimbru Chișinău players
CSF Bălți players
FC Shakhter Karagandy players
Moldova international footballers
Kazakhstan Premier League players
Moldovan Super Liga players
Expatriate footballers in Kazakhstan
Moldovan expatriate sportspeople in Kazakhstan
Association football defenders
Moldovan football managers
FC Academia Chișinău managers
FC Sheriff Tiraspol managers
FC Zimbru Chișinău managers
FC Milsami Orhei managers
FC Kyzylzhar managers
Moldovan expatriate football managers
Expatriate football managers in Kazakhstan
Moldovan Super Liga managers